E with diaeresis and macron (Ӭ̄ ӭ̄; italics: Ӭ̄ ӭ̄) is a letter of the Cyrillic script.

E with diaeresis and macron is used in the Kildin Sami language.

See also
Cyrillic characters in Unicode

Cyrillic letters with diacritics
Letters with macron
Letters with diaeresis